María Eugenia Rubio (1933 – 9 December 2013) was a Mexican singer and actress, one of the pioneers of Mexican rock and roll music.

She began her career singing boleros and recording songs such as «Cachito» and «Te adoraré más y más» for Musart Records.

In the early 1960s, she found greater success as a rock and roll singer and recorded two studio albums with the Orfeón label. She also appeared as an actress in the Mexican films A ritmo de twist and Las hijas del Amapolo (both 1962), where she sang her hit single "Fuiste tú".

Discography
 Cándida..! con María Eugenia Rubio (1961)
 María Eugenia Rubio (1962)

Filmography
 Jóvenes y rebeldes (1961)
 A ritmo de twist (1962)
 Las hijas del Amapolo (1962)

References

External links
 

1933 births
2013 deaths
Bolero singers
Mexican women singers
Mexican film actresses